Jennifer Roma Seberry (also published as Jennifer Seberry Wallis, born 13 February 1944 in Sydney) is an Australian cryptographer, mathematician, and computer scientist, currently a professor at the University of Wollongong, Australia. She was formerly the head of the Department of Computer Science and director of the Centre for Computer Security Research at the university.

Education and career
Seberry attended Parramatta High School and got her BSc at University of New South Wales, 1966; MSc at La Trobe University, 1969; PhD at La Trobe University, 1971 (Computational Mathematics); B.Ec. with two years completed at University of Sydney. Her doctoral advisor was Bertram Mond.

Seberry was the first person to teach cryptology at an Australian University (University of Sydney). She was also the first woman Professor of Computer Science in Australia. She was the first woman Reader in Combinatorial Mathematics in Australia.

 she had supervised 30 doctorates and had 71 academic descendants. Her notable students have included Peter Eades, Mirka Miller, and Deborah Street.

Service
Seberry was a founding member of the University of Sydney's Research Foundation for Information Technology Information Security Group in 1987. The group grew into the Australian Information Security Association, an Australian representative industry body with over 1000 paid members and branches in most capitals.

Seberry was one of the founders of the Asiacrypt international conference in 1990 (then called Auscrypt).

Research
Seberry has contributed to the knowledge and use of Hadamard
matrices and bent functions for network security. She has published numerous papers on mathematics, cryptography, and computer and network security. She led the team that produced the LOKI and LOKI97 block ciphers and the HAVAL cryptographic hash functions. Seberry is also a co-author of the Py (spelled RU) stream cipher, which was a candidate for the eSTREAM stream cipher project.

References

External links
 Jennifer Seberry's page at University of Wollongong

Australian mathematicians
Australian cryptographers
Women mathematicians
Living people
Modern cryptographers
Computer security academics
1944 births
Academic staff of the University of Wollongong
International Association for Cryptologic Research fellows
People in information technology